Eliminationism is the belief that one's political opponents are, in the words of Oklahoma City University School of Law professor Phyllis E. Bernard, "a cancer on the body politic that must be excised—either by separation from the public at large, through censorship or by outright extermination—in order to protect the purity of the nation."

Etymology
The term eliminationism was coined by American political scientist Daniel Goldhagen in his 1996 book Hitler's Willing Executioners: Ordinary Germans and the Holocaust, in which he posits that the German public not only knew about, but supported, the Holocaust because of a unique and virulent "eliminationist antisemitism" within the German national identity, which had developed in the preceding centuries.

Types
The purpose of defining eliminationism is the inherent weakness of the term "genocide", which only allows for action where mass slaughter has already occurred. However, according to Goldhagen, extermination is usually seen as one (and the most extreme) option of getting rid of an unwanted people group seen as a threat, and in any case of extermination many of the other methods of eliminationism will also be present and probably used first.

There are five forms of eliminationism:
 Transformation: deleting/changing the cultural identities of people. (Examples include American Indian boarding schools)
 Repression: systematically limiting the power of the target group through political disenfranchisement, ghettos, enslavement, segregation, or other legal means. (Examples include anti-Jewish legislation in pre-war Nazi Germany, Jim Crow laws, voter suppression and Apartheid)
 Expulsion: removing the undesired group through deportation, forced removal, forced marches, concentration camps. (Examples include the Armenian genocide and the internment of Japanese Americans.)
 Preventing reproduction: forced sterilization, anti-miscegenation laws, or systematic rape so that there will be no future for the group.
 Extermination: mass murder or genocide.

Effects

In his 2009 book Worse Than War: Genocide, Eliminationism, and the Ongoing Assault on Humanity, Goldhagen argued that eliminationism is integral to politics due to mass murder being "a political act", writing that "mass elimination is always preventable and always results from conscious political choice." Goldhagen describes various 20th-century atrocities, such as the Indonesian mass killings of 1965–66 and genocides in Darfur, Yugoslavia, Rwanda and Guatemala, arguing that each of these events were products of eliminationism, being perpetrated by "the decisions of a handful of powerful people" in contrast to popular perceptions of such events being carried out "in a frenzy of bloodlust."

Businessman Theodore N. Kaufman self-published Germany Must Perish! in the United States in 1941. In the 104-page book, Kaufman advocated genocide through forced sterilization of all Germans and the territorial disassociation of Germany. The obscure book received very little attention in the U.S., but was eventually cited by the Nazi regime as proof of a vast Jewish conspiracy to annihilate Germany and Germans (Kaufman was a Jew). The Nazis published quotes from the book in wartime propaganda, pretending that the book was indicative of the views of the Allied powers, which in turn was added justification for Nazi Germany's continued persecution of the Jews as part of the Holocaust.

During the 1991–2002 Algerian Civil War, the predominant faction of the conflict's first phase was known as les éradicateurs for their ideology and for their rural and urban tactics. These hardliners were opposed in the Army and the FLN by les dialoguistes.

Journalist David Neiwert argued in 2009 that eliminationist rhetoric is becoming increasingly mainstream within the American right-wing, fuelled in large part by the extremist discourse found on conservative blogs and talk radio shows, which may provoke a resurgence of lone wolf terrorism in the United States.

Professor of law Phyllis E. Bernard argues that interventions in Rwanda and Nigeria, which adapted American dispute prevention and resolution methods to African media and dispute resolution traditions, may provide a better fit and forum for the U.S. to address eliminationist media messages and their impact on society.

See also
 Incitement to genocide

References 

Censorship
Nationalism
Human rights abuses
Persecution
Political theories
Political repression
1990s neologisms